Slavutych Football Club was a Ukrainian football club from Slavutych, Kyiv Oblast. Founded in 1994, it participated in professional competitions in 1995–1998 spending three seasons in the Ukrainian Second League.

History

Overview
The first football activities in the city started in 1987, just after its foundation to replace  Pripyat, abandoned after the Chernobyl disaster of 1986. The football club Stroitel Pripyat, founded in 1970s, was renamed "Stroitel Slavutych", and ceased its activities after the end of 1988 season.

The club joined competitions four rounds before the end of the 1994-95 Ukrainian Third League season replacing the bankrupted club FC Transimpeks Vyshneve which after its merge with FC Ros Bila Tserkva it moved to the town of Trezyne near Bila Tserkva.

Name
 1995–1996 FC Skhid Slavutych
 1996–1997 FC Nerafa Slavutych
 1997–1998 FC Slavutych-ChAES Slavutych

League and cup history
{|class="wikitable"
|-bgcolor="#efefef"
! Season
! Div.
! Pos.
! Pl.
! W
! D
! L
! GS
! GA
! P
!Domestic Cup
!colspan=2|Europe
!Notes
|-
|1994–95
|4
|15
|42
|14
|9
|19
|35
|51
|51
|
|
|
|}

See also
 FC Stroitel Pripyat
 List of football clubs in Ukraine

References

 
Defunct football clubs in Ukraine
Football clubs in Kyiv Oblast
Association football clubs established in 1994
Association football clubs disestablished in 1998
1994 establishments in Ukraine
1998 disestablishments in Ukraine